Noel Franklin Jr. (born November 18, 1982) better known by the stage names London and Londonland, is an American recording artist from Oakland, California. London signed a recording deal with Universal Motown and released the singles "One 2 Many", "Sometimes" and "Back to the Way", all of them were intended to be on his full-length album Londonland, which was ultimately cancelled by Motown. After departing from the label, he released his debut album Welcome to Londonland independently in December 2013 only as a Japan release.

History
London was born and raised in Oakland, California. He moved to Atlanta and attended Morehouse College.<ref>https://www.submithub.com/artist/londonland</</ref>

Discography

Albums
 Welcome to Londonland (2013)
 Unconditional (2017)
 Players Got Feelings Too (2019)

Singles
"One 2 Many" (2008)
"Sometimes" (2009)
"Back to the Way" (2009)
"Higher" (2013)
"Rollin" (2014)
"Mary Jane" (2014)
"It'z 4 Me" (2014)
"Lil Baby" (2016)
"Hennessy Straight" (2017)

References

1982 births
Living people
21st-century American singers
People from Oakland, California
 Universal Motown Records artists
Singers from California